KGKS (93.9 FM, "Mike FM") is a radio station broadcasting an adult hits music format. Licensed to Scott City, Missouri, United States, the station is currently owned by Max Media through MRR License LLC and features programming from Citadel Media.

History
The Federal Communications Commission issued a construction permit for the station to Zimmer Radio of Mid-Missouri, Inc. on April 16, 1998. The station was issued the KGKS call sign on June 29, 1998, and received its license to cover on January 14, 1999. On June 2, 2004, the station's license was assigned by Zimmer Radio to the current owner, Mississippi River Radio. Included in the transaction were the licenses for Missouri stations KCGQ-FM, KGIR, KJEZ, KKLR-FM, KLSC, KMAL, KSIM, KWOC, and KZIM.

Previously carrying a longtime classic hits format as "93.9 The River", the station, following the end of the station's annual Christmas music stunt at Midnight on December 26, 2021, flipped to an adult hits format as "93.9 Mike FM". The first song on Mike was "Jack and Diane" by John Cougar Mellencamp, and the format launched with a commercial-free run of 9,300 minutes, lasting through the following Sunday, January 2. The station retains a majority of their previous playlist as well as The River's DJs (a particularly unique move as most adult hits stations are known for their jockless programming), but expanded it to the typical adult hits boundaries to include songs more recent, from the mid-1990s onward.

Former logo

References

External links

GKS
Adult hits radio stations in the United States
Radio stations established in 1999
Max Media radio stations
1999 establishments in Missouri